The 2021 VTV Awards (Vietnamese: Ấn tượng VTV 2021 - Hành trình nhiệm màu) is a ceremony honouring the outstanding achievement in television on the Vietnam Television (VTV) network from August 2020 to July 2021. It was planned to take place on September 5, 2021 but delayed due to the impact of COVID-19 quarantine. On December 3, it was announced that the ceremony will  take place on January 1, 2022 merging with New Year welcoming show.

This year, audience can only vote in Round 2 (Top 5). For the first time, audience votes are collected from views, heart-dropping and shares on the VTVGo mobile app.

Winners and nominees
(Winners denoted in bold)

Presenters/Awarders

Special performances

References

External links

List of television programmes broadcast by Vietnam Television (VTV)

2021 television awards
VTV Awards
2021 in Vietnamese television
January 2022 events in Vietnam